Championship Manager 4 is a football management game in the Championship Manager series.

Publication history
It was the penultimate game in the series to be developed by Sports Interactive before they and publishers Eidos decided to go their separate ways. The game was released for Windows in March 2003 and then on the Mac on 17 May 2003.

Reception
It was hugely anticipated by fans of the series, mainly due to the inclusion of a graphical 2D match-engine for the first time in a CM game. and upon its release it became the fastest selling PC game of all time in the UK, outselling the nearest best selling PC title, Command & Conquer: Generals, by around two to one.

Championship Manager 4 received a "Platinum" sales award from the Entertainment and Leisure Software Publishers Association (ELSPA), indicating sales of at least 300,000 copies in the United Kingdom.

Computer Gaming World nominated Championship Manager 4 for their 2003 "Sports Game of the Year" award, which ultimately went to Madden NFL 2004.

See also
 Championship Manager series
 Football Manager

References

2003 video games
Association football management video games
Classic Mac OS games
Eidos Interactive games
Golden Joystick Award winners
Multiplayer hotseat games
MacOS games
Windows games
Video games developed in the United Kingdom